Peder Møller may refer to:

Peder Møller (violinist) (1877–1940), Danish violinist and music teacher
Peder Møller (gymnast) (1891–1972), Danish gymnast
Peder Ludvig Møller (1814–1865), Danish literary critic
Peter Møller (born 1972), Danish footballer